This is a list of the Tamil Christian population per city.

Districts with highest percentage of Tamil Christians as per 2011 census

See also
 Tamil population per nation
 Tamil population by cities
 States of India by Tamil speakers
 Tamil Muslim population by cities
 Tamil Loanwords in other languages
 Tamil language
 Tamil people
 List of countries and territories where Tamil is an official language

References 

Tamil Christian
Tamil Christian
Tamil
Population